Dmitry Ponomarev may refer to:

 Dmitry Ponomarev (businessman) (1952–2020), Russian entrepreneur 
 Dmitry Ponomarev (submariner) (1908–1982), Soviet submarine commander